Dara Rasami (August 26, 1873 – December 9, 1933), was a princess of Chiang Mai and Siam (later Thailand) and the daughter of King Inthawichayanon of Chiang Mai and Queen Thip Keson of Chiang Mai descended from the Chet Ton Dynasty. She was one of the princess consorts of Chulalongkorn, King Rama V of Siam and gave birth to one daughter by King Chulalongkorn, Princess Vimolnaka Nabisi.

Early life 
Princess Dara Rasami of Chiang Mai was born on 26 August 1873 at Khum Luang in Chiang Mai, Lanna (now Northern Thailand). She was a daughter of King Inthawichayanon and Thip Keson of Chiang Mai. Her mother was a daughter of King Kawilorot and Queen Usa. Princess Dara Rasami had one elder sister, Princess Chantra Sopha of Chiang Mai, who died as a child.

As a young girl, Dara Rasami was educated in different languages and traditional royal customs. She was taught in and was proficient in Thai, Tai Yuan, and English, as well as in the traditional royal customs of both Lanna and Siam.

Her favorite sport was horse riding, and later in life she was said to be a skilled horsewoman.

To the royal palace 
As the British encroached further and further into Burma in the 1860s and '70s, Siam became concerned that England wanted to annex the Kingdom of Chiang Mai (later northern Thailand). In 1883 a rumor spread that Queen Victoria wanted to adopt Princess Dara Rasami of Chiang Mai, which the Siamese saw as a British attempt to take over Lanna. King Chulalongkorn then sent his brother Prince Phicit Prichakorn to Chiang Mai to propose an engagement to Dara Rasami to become the king's concubine. In 1886, she left Chiang Mai to enter the Grand Palace in Bangkok, where she was given the title Chao Chom Dara Rasami of the Chakri Dynasty.

Life in the Grand Palace 
When Dara Rasami arrived at the Grand Palace her father sent money from Chiang Mai to King Chulalongkorn to build a new house for her. While she lived in the Grand Palace, Dara Rasami and the ladies in her entourage were ribbed and called "Lao ladies," as well as teased that they "smelled of fermented fish." Despite these difficulties, Dara Rasami and her entourage always wore Chiang Mai style textiles for their skirts (known as pha sin) with their long hair pulled up into a bun on the back of the head, in contrast to the clothing and hairstyles of the Siamese women. After seeing stage plays in Bangkok, Dara Ratsami wrote a dramatic plot for a dance-drama in the northern style. Since then, many northern-style dances have been adapted for the stage.

She gave birth to King Chulalongkorn's daughter, Princess Vimolnaka Nabisi, on 2 October 1889, whereupon the king promoted her to the rank of Chao Chom Manda from Chao Chom. However, when her daughter was only two years, eight months old, she became ill and died on 21 February 1892. Her death brought sadness to the King, and the royal families of both the Siamese and Chiang Mai kingdoms. Princess Dara Rasami was so distraught after her only daughter's death, that she destroyed all photos and portraits of her as well as those of her husband and daughter together. The child's ashes were divided in half, with one part kept with her mother's ashes in the Chiang Mai Royal Cemetery at Wat Suan Dok, and the other in the Royal Cemetery, Wat Ratchabophit, Bangkok.

On 12 February 1908, King Chulalongkorn raised Chao Chom Manda Dara Rasami to  Her Highness Princess Dara Rasami , The Princess consort or Chao Dara Rasami Phra Racha Chaya, in the only such promotion ever. Her title as fifth consort remained junior to those of the other four royal consorts, Sunandha Kumariratana, Sukumalmarsri, Savang Vadhana and Saovabha Phongsri.

Return to Chiang Mai 
From the time she became Princess Consort in 1886, Dara Rasami returned to Chiang Mai twice. In 1908, King Intavarorot Suriyavongse of Chiang Mai, who was her half brother, came to Bangkok and visited King Chulalongkorn. At that time, Princess Dara Rasami asked for permission from King Chulalongkorn to visit her relatives in Chiang Mai, which he granted.

However, King Chulalongkorn was concerned for her safety on the long journey. On 2 February 1909, the King along with the royal family, officials of the department and senior government officials, came to send her off by train at Samsen train station. The King ordered his brother, Prince Damrong Rajanubhab and Prince Dilok Noppharat (son of King Chulalongkorn and Lady Thipkesorn of Chiang Mai) to meet Princess Dara Rasami at Nakorn Sawan from where she traveled to Chiang Mai by boat.

At that time, transportation was very slow and it took Dara Rasami two months and nine days to travel to Chiang Mai, where she arrived on 9 April 1909. Chao Phraya Surasri Wisitsak, the governor general of northwest territory, the royal family of Chiang Mai, soldiers and people from all over Lan Na came to celebrate her arrival.

While in Chiang Mai, Dara Rasami visited her relatives in Lamphun and Lampang as well as the people in Lan Na. She and King Chulalongkorn corresponded regularly via many affectionate letters throughout the time she was away from Bangkok.

Princess Dara Rasami returned to Bangkok after about six months. Upon her return, the King and the royal family, government officials and people came to receive her with 100 royal boats at Ang Thong. From there, she and the King went to Bang Pa-In Royal Palace, where they stayed for two days before returning to Bangkok on 26 November 1909.

Death of King Chulalongkorn 
After Dara Rasami came back to Bangkok, she moved into a new house, Suan Farang Kangsai, which the King had built for her next to Vimanmek Palace while she was away. Only a year later, however, her husband died on 23 October 1910 of kidney disease at Dusit Palace.

Following his death, Dara Rasami continued to live in Dusit Palace until 1914, when she asked for permission from King Vajiravudh to return to Chiang Mai to retire. The King granted her permission, and she returned Chiang Mai on 22 January 1914.

Later life and death 

Princess Dara Rasami continued with her royal duties for the people of Lanna. In later life, she lived in Daraphirom Palace that King Vajiravudh built for her and her official attendants. On 30 June 1933, an old lung ailment recurred. Both western and Thai doctors tried to cure her, but no one succeeded. Her half brother, King Kaew Nawarat moved her into his palace at Khum Rin Keaw for treatment, but on 9 December 1933, she died there peacefully at the age of 60. Dararatsami Hospital, 101 Mae Rim, Chiang Mai, is named for her.

Royal decorations
  Dame Cross of the Most Illustrious Order of Chula Chom Klao (First class)
  Dame Grand Cordon (Special Class) of the Most Noble Order of the Crown of Thailand
   King Rama VII Royal Cypher Medal, First Class

Ancestry

Literature 
 
Saengdao na Chiang Mai, Biography of Phra Rajajaya Jao Dara Rasami, 26 August 1873 – 9 December 1933. Published in Conjunction With the 100-Days Ceremony for Jao Saengdao Na Chiang Mai, 18 August 1974. Chiang Mai: กลางเวียง [Central City], 2517.

References

External links 
 พระราชชายา เจ้าดารารัศมี – Chiang Mai person
 "เจ้าดารารัศมี" ดวงใจแห่งเมืองเหนือของพุทธเจ้าหลวง
 Chiang Mai celebrates a family legacy  

Thai princesses
Thai princesses consort
Chet Ton dynasty
Consorts of Chulalongkorn
19th-century Thai women
20th-century Thai women
19th-century Chakri dynasty
20th-century Chakri dynasty
Dames Grand Cross of the Order of Chula Chom Klao
1873 births
1933 deaths
People from Chiang Mai province